George R. Achica (born December 19, 1960) is a former American college and professional football defensive tackle.  Achica played college football for the University of Southern California, and was recognized as an All-American.  He played professionally for the Los Angeles Express of the United States Football League (USFL), and the Indianapolis Colts of the National Football League (NFL).

Early years
Achica was born in American Samoa.  He prepped at Andrew Hill High School in San Jose, California.

College career
Achica attended the University of Southern California, where he played for the USC Trojans football team from 1979 to 1982.  He was recognized as a consensus first-team All-American, the Lombardi Award runner-up, and Morris Trophy winner as a senior in 1982.  Achica was the first of four Samoans to be selected as All-Americans at USC; the others being Junior Seau, Troy Polamalu, and Lofa Tatupu.

Achica was also a three-time first-team Pac-10 defensive line selection from 1980-1982. One of Achica's Samoan teammates at USC is current Jacksonville Jaguars running backs coach Kennedy Pola.

Professional career
Achica was picked in the 3rd round with the 57th overall pick in the 1983 NFL Draft by the Baltimore Colts but chose to play for the USFL's Los Angeles Express from 1983 to 1985. He played in 42 games with the Express and had 12 sacks and a fumble recovery.

Achica played nose tackle for the NFL's Indianapolis Colts in 1985 and went to San Francisco 49ers training camp in 1986 but retired weeks later.

References

1960 births
Living people
American sportspeople of Samoan descent
Players of American football from San Jose, California
Players of American football from American Samoa
American football defensive tackles
USC Trojans football players
All-American college football players
Indianapolis Colts players